Guillaume Gazet, Latinized Gulielmus Gazaeus (1554–1612) was a poet and ecclesiastical historian in the Spanish Netherlands. His brother, Antoine Gazet, was a physician and translator.

Life
Gazet was born in Arras, then part of the Habsburg Netherlands (now in France), in 1554. Around 1580 he was appointed parish priest of the church of Sainte-Marie-Madeleine in Arras, and later became a canon of the collegiate church of Saint-Pierre in Aire-sur-la-Lys while retaining his position as parish priest.

He died in Arras on 25 August 1612 and was buried in his parish church there.

Works

As author
 Magdalis. Comoedia sacra (Douai, Jan Bogard, 1589)
 Chanson nouvelle pour l'heureux succez de l'armée catholicque ensemble, de la prinse des ville et chasteau de Calais (Arras, Robert Maudhuy, 1596)
 L'ordre et suite des evesques et archevesques de Cambray (Arras, Gilles Baudouin, 1597)
 L'ordre des evesques d'Arras depuis la separation de l'evesché de Cambray (Arras, Gilles Baudouin, 1598)
 L'ordre et suyte des evesques de Cambray et d'Arras (Arras, chez Gilles Baudouin, 1598)
 Briève histoire de la sacrée manne et de la sainte chandelle miraculeusement données de Dieu et religieusement conservées en la ville et cité d'Arras (Arras, Gilles Baudouin, 1598)
 Le cabinet des Dames: contenant l'ornement spirituel de la femme (Arras, Gilles Baudouin, 1602). Available on Google Books
 Le consolateur des ames scrupvleuses (Arras, Robert Maudhuy, 1610. Available on Google Books
 Tableaux sacrez de la Gaule Belgique (Arras, Guillaume de la Rivière, 1610). Available on Google Books
 La Bibliotheque Sacree du Pays-Bas (Arras, Guillaume de la Rivière, 1610). Available on Google Books
 L'Histoire ecclésiastique des Pays-Bas (Arras, Guillaume de la Rivière, 1614). Available on Google Books

As editor
 Simeon Metaphrastes, Histoire de la vie, mort, passion et miracles des saints (Arras, Jean Bourgeois, 1584; reissued Arras 1596; Douai 1598)
 Juan de Polanco, Directoire des confesseurs (Lyon, Nicolas Choquenot, 1598; reissued Douai, 1599)
 Various authors, Thesaurus precum et litaniarum (Arras, Robert Maudhuy, 1601). Available on Google Books

References

1554 births
1612 deaths
People from Arras
Roman Catholic priests of the Spanish Netherlands